Spode is a company producing pottery and porcelain in Staffordshire, England.

Spode may also refer to:
 Josiah Spode (1733–1797), renowned English potter, founder of the Spode company
 Spode Museum, dedicated to the Spode company, located in Stoke-on-Trent, England
 Spode Music Week, an annual residential music school in the UK, originally based in Spode House, Staffordshire
 Hasso Spode (born 1951), German historian and sociologist
 Roderick Spode, an amateur fascist dictator in the stories of P. G. Wodehouse
 Spode, a fictional god from the game Spore